Greg Pahl (born January 19, 1946, in Meridan, Connecticut) is a journalist, author and energy activist based in Addison County, VT.   Pahl's books and articles generally focus on renewable energy issues.  He is a founding member of the Vermont Biofuels Association as well as the Addison County Relocalization Network.

Early life
Pahl was raised in New York City. After graduating high school, he went on to obtain his bachelor's degree from the University of Vermont in 1967. Upon receiving his degree, he later served as a military intelligence officer in Germany for about two years. In 1970, he moved back to Vermont where he worked for a number of small businesses.

Environment efforts
Pahl spent several years living in a wood-heated home powered by a wind turbine. He also heated his house with a biodiesel fuel blend and wood pellets, and installed a solar hot water system on the roof of his garage. Pahl drives a 2007 Toyota Prius.

Career
Pahl began writing for a variety of publications in the late 70s until eventually he landed a full-time job as a freelance writer and journalist. In his writings, he focused on arts, business, finance, farming, wind power, solar energy, electric cars, biodiesel, "green" appliances, home building materials, and sustainable forestry management. He wrote for many publications which include: The Vermont Times, Vermont Magazine, Champlain Business Journal, Vermont History, Middlebury College Magazine, and Mother Earth News.

Family
Pahl is married to his wife Joy and together they live in Weybridge, Vermont.

Books
Power From The People: How to Organize, Finance, and Launch Local Energy Projects, Chelsea Green Publishing, 2012 
The Citizen-Powered Energy Handbook: Community Solutions to a Global Crisis, Chelsea Green Publishing, 2007, 
Biodiesel: Growing a New Energy Economy, Chelsea Green Publishing, 2005, 
Natural Home Heating: The Complete Guide to Renewable Energy Options, Chelsea Green Publishing, 2003, 
The Complete Idiot's Guide to Saving the Environment, Alpha Books, 2002, 
The Unofficial Guide to Beating Debt, IDG Books, 1999,

Awards
2004 Independent Publishers Book Award, Natural Home Heating
2013 Atlas Award honoring climate heroes worldwide for his 2012 book, Power from the People: How to Organize, Finance and Launch Local Energy Projects (Chelsea Green).

References

Living people
1946 births
American male journalists
American activists
20th-century American journalists